Church of St. James the Greater may refer to:

 Church of St. James the Greater (Prague), Czech Republic
 Church of St. James the Greater (Bristol), England
 Church of St. James the Greater (Sokolniki), Poland
 Church of St James the Great, Sedgley, England
 Saint James' the Elder church (Štvrtok na Ostrove), Slovakia
 Church of St. James the Greater (Jihlava)